A Scandinavian is a resident of Scandinavia or something associated with the region, including:

Culture
 Scandinavianism, political and cultural movement
 Scandinavian design, a design movement of the 1950s
 Scandinavian folklore
 Scandinavian languages, a common alternative term for North Germanic languages
 Scandinavian literature, literature in the language of the Nordic Countries
 Scandinavian mythology

People
 Scandinavian Americans, in the United States
 Scandinavians or North Germanic peoples, the most common name for modern North Germanic peoples
 Scandinavians, any citizen of the countries of Scandinavia
 Scandinavians, ethnic groups originating in Scandinavia, irrespective of ethnolinguistic affiliation

Places
 Scandinavian Mountains, a mountain range on the Scandinavian peninsula
 Scandinavian Peninsula, a geographic region of northern Europe

Ships
 SS Scandinavian, a ship

Other
 Scandinavian Airlines (SAS), an aviation corporation
 Scandinavian Defense, a chess opening
 Scandinavian Gold Cup, an international sailing competition established in 1919
 Scandinavian flick, a driving technique
 Scandinavian (Fabergé egg)

See also
 Scandinavia (disambiguation)
 Old Scandinavian (disambiguation)